The women's javelin throw event at the 1992 World Junior Championships in Athletics was held in Seoul, Korea, at Olympic Stadium on 18 and 19 September.  An old-specification 600 g javelin was used.

Medalists

Results

Final
19 September

Qualifications
18 Sep

Group A

Group B

Participation
According to an unofficial count, 28 athletes from 19 countries participated in the event.

References

Javelin throw
Javelin throw at the World Athletics U20 Championships